The Immaculate Heart of Mary Cathedral also known as the Sacred Heart Cathedral of Our Lady or North Church where it is located, is a religious building that is affiliated with the Catholic Church and is located in North District, Hsinchu City, Taiwan.

The current building was opened for religious services in October 1957 with a capacity of 1,000 people. She arrived some religious who were expelled or fled from the mainland by what at first had difficulty adapting to the local Chinese dialects.

The temple follows the Roman or Latin rite and serves as the seat of Roman Catholic Diocese of Hsinchu (Dioecesis Hsinchuensis; 天主教新竹教區) which was created in 1961 by the Bull "In Taipehensi" of Pope John XXIII. It is under the pastoral responsibility of the Bishop John Baptist Lee Keh-mien.

Transportation
The cathedral is accessible within walking distance north of Hsinchu Station of Taiwan Railways.

See also
 Catholic Church in Taiwan
 Immaculate Heart of Mary Cathedral

References

Religious buildings and structures in Hsinchu
Roman Catholic cathedrals in Taiwan
Roman Catholic churches completed in 1957
20th-century Roman Catholic church buildings